Joseph Sulley (28 May 1850 – 14 February 1932) was an English first-class cricketer active 1880–88 who played for Nottinghamshire. He was born in Arnold, Nottinghamshire; died in Daybrook.

References

1850 births
1932 deaths
English cricketers
Nottinghamshire cricketers
Gentlemen of the North cricketers